Jørgen Pilegaard Jensen (10 April 1944 – 2 October 2009) was a Danish middle- and long-distance runner.

Career
Jensen won the inaugural 1975 edition of Amsterdam Marathon on 3 May 1975, clocking 2:16:51. He ran the Olympic marathons in 1972 and 1976 and finished in 30th and 28th place, respectively.

Between 1966 and 1976 Jensen won eight national team titles (4 × 1500 m relay and cross-country) and eight individual titles, in the 5000 m (1966), 10000 m (1973), 20 km (1972 and 1974) and marathon (1973-1976).

Achievements

External links 
 1975 Year Ranking
 
 

1944 births
2009 deaths
Danish male long-distance runners
Danish male marathon runners
Athletes (track and field) at the 1972 Summer Olympics
Athletes (track and field) at the 1976 Summer Olympics
Olympic athletes of Denmark
People from Lolland